Mézières-sur-Issoire is a former commune in the Haute-Vienne department in west-central France. On 1 January 2016, it was merged into the new commune Val-d'Issoire.

Inhabitants are known as Méziérauds.

See also
Communes of the Haute-Vienne department

References

Former communes of Haute-Vienne